Travis McHenry is an American-born micronationalist and businessman, the founder and creator of two micronations, Westarctica and Calsahara, neither of which has been recognized by any world government.

In 2001, while a seaman in the United States Navy, McHenry founded the micronation of Westarctica. In 2004, he appointed himself ruler of the Grand Duchy of Westarctica, which was located in the Marie Byrd Land region of Antarctica. He has said that this took advantage of an apparent loophole in the Antarctic Treaty System. In 2006, after learning that McHenry had been communicating with foreign governments asking them to recognize the nation, the Navy required him to abdicate. , Westarctica claims a population of 2,356 citizens (none of whom actually live there), and McHenry still calls himself its Grand Duke.

In 2009, after McHenry left the military, he acquired a few acres of rural desert land in Southern California from his family, and founded Calsahara. McHenry later expanded it to cover 117 acres. A 2015 profile in Los Angeles magazine described the project as good-natured, but said, "It's hard to discern whether Calsahara is a serious endeavor or an absurdly long-term joke." In October 2017, McHenry's two micronations were linked when Calsahara was 'annexed' by Westarctica becoming a 'colony' of the Westarctican territory.

Sometime before 2011, McHenry changed the name of Westarctica from "Grand Duchy of Westarctica" to "Protectorate of Westarctica." In 2014, McHenry made Westarctica into a non-profit organization that advocates for protection of Antarctic wildlife and for the study of climate change.

Trivia 
The Micronational Hall of Excellence is an institution created with the goal of preserving history and recognizing the contributions of significant individuals in the field of micronationalism. McHenry was one of the eight individuals who received the Norton Award and was inducted during MicroCon 2022 in Las Vegas. Other nominees were Emperor Norton, Paddy Roy Bates, Kevin Baugh, Niels Vermeersch, Lars Vilks, Leonard Casley and Gabrielle Pourchet.

References

External links 
Westarctica website
Grand Duchy of Westarctica at the Micronations Wiki
MicroWiki biography

1980 births
Living people
Micronational leaders
United States Navy sailors
Place of birth missing (living people)
Self-proclaimed monarchy